Solid Action, is a compilation album released in 1999 by Seattle-based rock band The U-Men. It was released by the label Chuckie-Boy. The name of the album is taken from track 10 on Step on a Bug.

Track listing
 Gila - 2.18
 Shoot 'Em Down - 4.05
 Blight - 2.32
 Flowers D.G.I.H. - 4.07
 They  - 3.30
 Clubs - 4.20
 10 After 1 - 2.57
 Cow Rock - 2.42
 Green Trumpet - 3.49
 Bad Little Woman - 2.32
 Freezebomb  - 2.23
 That's Wild About Jack - 3.31
 Dig It a Hole - 2.16
 Solid Action - 2.08
 2 X 4 - 2.00
 A Three Year Old Could Do That - 2.34
 Papa Doesn't Love His Children Anymore - 3.30
 Shoot 'Em Down (live) - 4.30
Track 5 was originally from Deep Six compilation (C/Z Records, 1986).
Tracks 6-9 were originally from Stop Spinning
Track 10 was originally from Dope-Guns-'N-Fucking In The Streets, Vol. 1 compilation (Amphetamine Reptile, 1988).
Tracks 13-17 are originally from Step On A Bug
Track 18 was originally from the compilation Woodshock '85 (El Jefe Records, 1986).

References

Grunge compilation albums
1999 compilation albums
The U-Men albums